Sarah Haskins (born March 13, 1981) is an American triathlete from St. Louis, Missouri. She competed in triathlon at the 2008 Summer Olympics in Beijing and is the 2011 Pan American Games Gold medalist.

Education
After graduating from Parkway South High School, Haskins attended the University of Tulsa from 1999 to 2003. She obtained an athletic scholarship for cross country and track and had several All-Conference finishes during her career there. Haskins graduated in May 2003 with a degree in elementary education and a minor in mathematics.

Triathlon career
Haskins began competing in triathlons during the summer of 2003 after graduating college and turned pro in 2004. Haskins has a strong swimming background, she was swimming competitively at age five and swimming year-round by the age of nine years.

At the 2008 Olympics, she finished in 11th place, with a time of 2:01:22.57. She finished in eighth place in the women's event at the 2015 Pan American Games.

Career accomplishments
2011 Pan Am Games Gold Medalist
2011 Lifetime Fitness Race to The Toyota Cup Champion
2011 Hy-Vee 5150 US Championship 3rd
2009 Lifetime Fitness Race to The Toyota Cup Champion
2008 U.S. Olympic Team Member  (11th Beijing )
6 Year USAT National Team Member
2008 ITU World Championship Silver Medalist
2007 Pan Am Games Silver Medalist
2006 USAT Elite National Champion
2006 Haul to the Great Wall Elite Series Champion
2004 USAT U23 National Champion

References

External links 
 
 Profile at USA Triathlon
 Interview with Women's Health magazine
 Interview with "Travlete" website

1981 births
Living people
American female triathletes
Olympic triathletes of the United States
Triathletes at the 2007 Pan American Games
Triathletes at the 2008 Summer Olympics
Triathletes at the 2011 Pan American Games
Triathletes at the 2015 Pan American Games
University of Tulsa alumni
Pan American Games gold medalists for the United States
Pan American Games medalists in triathlon
People from High Ridge, Missouri
Medalists at the 2011 Pan American Games
21st-century American women
Tulsa Golden Hurricane women's track and field athletes